Fritillaria sichuanica is a Chinese plant species of the lily family. It is found only in China, found in the Provinces of Gansu, Qinghai, and Sichuan. It belongs to subgenus Fritillaria.

Fritillaria sichuanica produces bulbs up to 20 mm in diameter. Stem is up to 50 cm tall. Flowers are nodding (hanging downwards), yellow-green with deep purple spots the spots sometimes so dense that the flower appears from a distance to be more purple than yellow-green.

References

sichuanica
Endemic flora of China
Plants described in 1983